Locus is a racing video game developed by Zombie Studios and published by GT Interactive in North America. It was published in 1995 for MS-DOS, Microsoft Windows, and Mac OS.

Gameplay
The player takes control of a mech in a competitive racing arena from a first-person perspective. The arena has no gravity, so competitors can fly in any direction within a three-dimensional space.

Reception
The French gaming magazine, "Joystick", gave a review of this game in February 1996. The German edition of PowerPlay magazine also reviewed this game in March 1996. Finally, the now defunct AllGame.com reviewed this game.

References

1995 video games
DOS games
Classic Mac OS games
Video games about mecha
Racing video games
Video games developed in the United States
Windows games
Zombie Studios games